"Born in '69" is a song by the American alternative rock band Rocket from the Crypt, released as the first single from their 1995 album Scream, Dracula, Scream! It was released as both a 7" vinyl and CD single by Elemental Records and peaked at #68 on the UK Singles Chart. A music video directed by Steve Hanft received play on MTV and MTV Europe.

Track listing
"Born in '69"
"Ciao Patsy"

Personnel
Speedo (John Reis) - guitar, lead vocals
ND (Andy Stamets) - guitar, backing vocals
Petey X (Pete Reichert) - bass, backing vocals
Apollo 9 (Paul O'Beirne) - saxophone, percussion, backing vocals
JC 2000 (Jason Crane) - trumpet, percussion, backing vocals
Atom (Adam Willard) - drums
Mick Collins - backing vocals
Donnell Cameron - engineering, recording
Eddie Miller - assistant engineer
Andy Wallace - mixing of "Born in '69"
Mark Trombino - mixing of "Ciao Patsy"
Mike Nelson - layout, video stills

Chart positions

References 

1995 singles
Rocket from the Crypt songs
1995 songs